Bolma minuta is a species of sea snail, a marine gastropod mollusk in the family Turbinidae, the turban snails.

Distribution
This species occurs in the Red Sea.

References

minuta
Molluscs of the Indian Ocean
Fauna of the Red Sea
Gastropods described in 1998